The 2000–01 Logan Cup was a first-class cricket competition held in Zimbabwe from 16 February 2001 – 30 March 2001. It was won by Mashonaland, who won all five of their matches to top the table with 78 points.

Points table

References

2001 in Zimbabwean cricket
Domestic cricket competitions in 2000–01
Logan Cup